Alisoun (pronounced ) is a given name, a variant form of Alison. It may refer to:

Two of The Canterbury Pilgrims:
A character in The Wife of Bath's Tale
A character in The Miller's Tale
A character in Canterbury Tales (musical)

See also
Alison (disambiguation)
Allison (disambiguation)
Alyson
Allyson (disambiguation)